David Lee Clinefelter (born August 22, 1950) is an American teacher and academic administrator who served as president of Graceland University. He is dean of student affairs at the University of the People. Clinefelter was previously superintendent of Lamoni Community School District, provost of Kaplan University, and chief academic officer of Walden University.

Early life and education 
Clinefelter was born on August 22, 1950 in Sharon, Pennsylvania.

Clinefelter graduated from Graceland College in 1972. He completed a M.A. (1976) and Ph.D. (1978) at Ohio State University. His dissertation was titled Analysis of the interaction between students, teachers, and materials in intermediate grade mathematics classes.

Career 
Clinefelter was a high school teacher and principal. In 1989, he was the superintendent of Lamoni Community School District. Clinefelter was a professor at the University of Nebraska Omaha.

Clinefelter was vice president for academic affairs at Graceland College for six years. In 1996, he took a sabbatical to conduct a fellowship with the American Council on Education at Northwest Missouri State University. In 1997, Clinefelter succeeded William T. Higdon as president of Graceland College. He served as president for six years. Clinefelter was succeeded by John K. Menzies. In 2002, he became provost of Kaplan University. Clinefelter became the chief academic officer at Walden University in 2010. In 2011, he joined the Learninghouse, Inc. as their chief academic officer. He retired in 2017.

Clinefelter is dean of student affairs at the University of the People.

References

External links

Living people
People from Sharon, Pennsylvania
1950 births
Graceland University faculty
Graceland University alumni
Ohio State University alumni
University of Nebraska Omaha faculty
People from Lamoni, Iowa
Heads of universities and colleges in the United States
Kaplan University faculty
Walden University faculty
University of the People faculty
Schoolteachers from Pennsylvania
Schoolteachers from Iowa
20th-century American educators
21st-century American educators